I Offer You is an album featuring performances by jazz saxophonist Lucky Thompson which was released on the Groove Merchant label.

Reception 

Allmusic's Scott Yanow said: "After he stopped teaching in 1974, Lucky Thompson permanently dropped out of music. ... Thompson, switching between tenor and soprano, was still very much in his musical prime at the time of this LP but apparently soon became sick of the whole music business, a major loss to jazz. He plays quite well throughout the set".

Track listing
All compositions by Lucky Thompson except where noted
 "Munsoon" − 5:07
 "Sun Out" − 6:20
 "Yesterday's Child" − 4:26
 "Aliyah" − 5:05
 "The Moment of Truth" (Tex Satterwhite, Frank Scott) − 6:35
 "Back Home from Yesterday" − 5:58
 "Cherokee" (Ray Noble) − 4:42

Personnel
Lucky Thompson – tenor saxophone, soprano saxophone
Cedar Walton – electric piano, piano
Sam Jones – bass
Louis Hayes – drums

References

Groove Merchant albums
Lucky Thompson albums
1973 albums
Albums produced by Sonny Lester